Censky's ameiva (Pholidoscelis corax), also known as the Little Scrub Island ground lizard, is a species of lizard in the family Teiidae. It is indigenous to the Caribbean.

Description
P. corax is a melanistic species, superficially similar in its dark coloration and scalation to Pholidoscelis atratus and Pholidoscelis corvinus, other species also found on small, barren Caribbean islands. This is believed to be due to independent adaptation to the similar local environments.

Taxonomy
Censky's ameiva was described in 1992 as Ameiva corax. Its common name refers to one of its authors, Ellen Joan Censky. In 2016, the species was moved to Pholidoscelis based on genetic sequencing and phylogenetic analyses.

Geographic range
P. corax is endemic to the tiny islet of Little Scrub, off the coast of Scrub Island, Anguilla.

Conservation
It is likely vulnerable to development, invasive mammal introduction,
seasonal loss of vegetation during hurricanes, and declining seabird numbers (a food source).

References

Further reading

Malhotra, Anita; Thorpe, Roger S (1999). Reptiles & Amphibians of the Eastern Caribbean. Oxford, England: Macmillan Education Ltd. 144 pp.  (Ameiva corax, p. 54).
Powell, Robert; Henderson, Robert W. (2005). "Conservation Status of Lesser Antillean Reptiles". Iguana 12 (2): 63–77.

Pholidoscelis
Reptiles described in 1992
Taxa named by Ellen Joan Censky
Taxa named by Dennis Roy Paulson
Reptiles of Anguilla
Reptiles of the Caribbean
Endemic fauna of Anguilla